Old Balkello is a village in Angus, Scotland, three miles north of Dundee on the Auchterhouse to Tealing road.

References

Villages in Angus, Scotland